Liam Nolan is a British Muay Thai fighter who competes for the ONE Championship organization. He is the reigning WBC Muay Thai World Middleweight Champion.

Biography and career

Early years
Nolan grew up in London where he tried Wing Chun and Taekwondo before switching to Muay Thai and settling at The Minotaur Gym, future Knowlesy Academy. Under the teaching of Christian Knowles, Nolan started to compete regularly at the age of 13 in both Muay Thai and kickboxing rules often against older opponents. By the time he was 16 years old Nolan had decided to leave school and pursue a professional career.

On March 4, 2017 Nolan captured his first professional title when he defeated Dean Blunt by unanimous decision, becoming the IKF Pro Muay Thai British champion.

On September 29, 2017 Nolan faced Anthony Njokuani at the inaugural Triumphant fight series event in Rohnert Park, California, United States. Nolan won by split decision and became the WMC Intercontinental -72.5 kg Champion.

On May 5, 2018 Nolan traveled to France to compete on the Hanuman Fight event where he defeated Papou Samaké by decision after five rounds.

On October 6, 2018 Nolan faced Connor McCormack at the Roar Combat League 10 event. The fight would determine the #1 rated Super Welterweight fighter in the Uk and crown a new Roar Combat League champion. Nolan won by split decision.

ONE Championship

In January 2019 Liam Nolan signed a contract with ONE Championship. He made his debut on March 8, 2019 at ONE Championship: Reign of Valor against Enriko Kehl under kickboxing rules. Nolan was defeated by second-round TKO.

On August 16, 2019 Nolan faced Bangpleenoi PetchyindeeAcademy at ONE Championship: Dreams of Gold. The fight was disputed at a catchweight of 72 kg. He lost the fight by majority decision. The decision was controversial due to the referee judging as a slip what appeared to be a knockdown from an elbow strike landed by Nolan during the first round.

On November 22, 2019 Nolan registered his first win under the ONE banner as he defeated Brown Pinas by unanimous decision at ONE Championship: Edge Of Greatness.

WBC Muay Thai world middleweight champion
On November 7, 2021 Nolan challenged Youssef Boughanem for his WBC Muay Thai World title at a Real Fighters promotion event in Hilversum, Netherlands. Nolan won the fight by split decision, becoming the 8th WBC Muay Thai World Middleweight Champion and handing his first loss under Muay Thai rules in six years to the former champion.

Return to ONE Championship
In January 2022 Nolan announced he signed a new six-fight deal with ONE Championship. He was booked to face Eduard Saik at ONE: Lights Out on March 11, 2022. His opponent was replaced on short notice by Kim Kyung Lock who Nolan accepted to face at a catchweight. He won the fight by technical knockout in the first round.

Nolan faced Sinsamut Klinmee at ONE 159 on July 22, 2022, as a late notice replacement for Islam Murtazaev. He lost the fight by a second-round knockout, as he was floored with a counter left hook.

Nolan faced Eddie Abasolo on November 19, 2022, at ONE on Prime Video 4. He won the fight via unanimous decision.

Titles and accomplishments
ONE Championship
 Performance of the Night (One time) vs. Kim Kyung Lock
World Boxing Council Muay Thai
 2021 WBC Muay Thai World Middleweight Champion
Roar Combat League
 2018 RCL World Super Welterweight Champion
World Muay Thai Council
 2017 WMC Intercontinental -160 lbs Champion
International Kickboxing Federation
 2017 IKF Pro Muay Thai British -160 lbs Champion
International Federation of Muaythai Associations
 2022 IFMA World Championships -75 kg 

Awards
Thai Fighter UK
 2018 Fighter of the Year
 2021 Fighter of the Year

Muay Thai record

|-  style="background:#cfc;"
| 2022-11-19 || Win ||align=left| Eddie Abasolo || ONE on Prime Video 4 || Kallang, Singapore || Decision (Unanimous) || 3 ||3:00

|-  style="background:#fbb;"
| 2022-07-22 || Loss ||align=left| Sinsamut Klinmee || ONE 159 || Kallang, Singapore || KO (Left hook) || 2 || 0:05
|-  style="background:#CCFFCC;"
| 2022-03-11|| Win  ||align=left| Kim Kyung Lock || ONE: Lights Out || Kallang, Singapore || TKO (Knees) || 1 || 1:02  
|-
|-
|- style="background:#CCFFCC;"
|  2021-11-07 || Win || align="left" | Youssef Boughanem || Real Fighters Promotions || Hilversum, Netherlands || Decision (Split)|| 5 || 3:00
|-
! style=background:white colspan=9 |

|- style="background:#CCFFCC;" 
|  2020-09-25 || Win || align="left" | Amadeusz Sakowicz  || Roar Combat League 20|| Cullompton, England || KO (Knee to the body)|| 1 ||

|-  style="background:#cfc;"
| 2019-11-22|| Win ||align=left| Brown Pinas || ONE Championship: Edge Of Greatness || Kallang, Singapore || Decision (Unanimous) || 3 ||3:00

|-  style="text-align:center; background:#fbb;"
| 2019-08-16|| Loss ||align=left| Bangpleenoi PetchyindeeAcademy || ONE Championship: Dreams of Gold || Bangkok, Thailand || Decision (Majority) || 3 ||3:00

|- style="background:#fbb;"
|  2019-03-08 || Loss || align="left" | Enriko Kehl || ONE Championship 92: Reign of Valor || Yangon, Myanmar || TKO (Left Knee to the Body) || 2 ||

|- style="background:#CCFFCC;" 
|  2018-12-01 || Win || align="left" | Noppakao Kor Kasanon || Roar Combat League 12|| Harrow, England || TKO (Middle Kick/Arm Injury)|| 5 ||

|- style="background:#CCFFCC;" 
|  2018-10-06 || Win || align="left" |  Connor McCormack || Roar Combat League 10|| Harrow, England || Decision (Split)|| 5 || 3:00
|-
! style=background:white colspan=9 |

|- style="background:#CCFFCC;"
|  2018-05-05 || Win || align="left" | Papou Samaké || Hanuman Fight IV||  Saint-Hilaire-de-Riez, France || Decision || 5 || 3:00
|-

|- style="background:#CCFFCC;" 
|  2018-03-10 || Win || align="left" | Charlie Guest || Stand and Bang|| Woking, England || Decision (Unanimous)|| 5 || 3:00
|-

|- style="background:#CCFFCC;" 
|  2017-12-23 || Win || align="left" | Yodsanklai || Best of Samui, Petchbuncha Stadium || Ko Samui, Thailand || KO || 1 ||

|- style="background:#CCFFCC;"
|  2017-09-29 || Win || align="left" | Anthony Njokuani || Triumphant I Muay Thai Series 1 || Rohnert Park, California, United States || Decision (Split)|| 5 || 3:00
|-
! style=background:white colspan=9 |

|- style="background:#CCFFCC;" 
|  2017-08-06 || Win || align="left" | Chris Melhuish || Road to Muay Thai Grand Prix|| Harrow, England || Decision (Unanimous)|| 3 || 3:00

|- style="background:#CCFFCC;" 
|  2017-03-04 || Win || align="left" | Dean Blunt || Pantheon Fight Sriees IMPERIUM || Hastings, England || Decision (Unanimous)|| 5 || 3:00
|-
! style=background:white colspan=9 |

|- style="background:#fbb;" 
|  2017-02-11 || Loss || align="left" | Leyton Collymore || Roar Combat League 5|| Bolton, England || Decision (Unanimous)|| 5 || 3:00

|- style="background:#fbb;" 
|  2016-05-28 || Loss || align="left" | Dominic Matusz || Roar Combat League || Watford, England || Decision (Split)|| 5 || 3:00

|- style="background:#CCFFCC;" 
|  2013-03-09 || Win || align="left" | Luke Imeson || Smash Muaythai 3 || Liverpool, England || Decision (Majority)|| 5 || 3:00

|-
| colspan=9 | Legend:    

|-  style="background:#fbb;"
| 2022-06-02|| Loss||align=left| Youssef Assouik|| IFMA World Championships 2022, Semi Finals|| Abu Dhabi, United Arab Emirates || Decision|| 3 || 3:00  
|-
! style=background:white colspan=9 |
|-  style="background:#cfc;"
| 2022-05-31|| Win||align=left| Domen Vidmar || IFMA World Championships 2022, Quarter Finals|| Abu Dhabi, United Arab Emirates || Decision (Unanimous)|| 3 || 3:00

|-  style="background:#cfc;"
| 2022-05-30|| Win||align=left| Marat Bakytzhan || IFMA World Championships 2022, Second Round|| Abu Dhabi, United Arab Emirates || Decision (Unanimous)|| 3 || 3:00

|-
| colspan=9 | Legend:

References

1997 births
Living people
British Muay Thai practitioners
British male kickboxers
ONE Championship kickboxers